Paul David Feinberg (August 13, 1938 – February 21, 2004) was an American theologian, author, and professor of systematic theology and philosophy of religion at Trinity Evangelical Divinity School.

Education and family
Feinberg was born on August 13, 1938, to Charles Lee and Anne Priscilla (née Fraiman) Feinberg. His family moved from Dallas, Texas to Los Angeles, California in 1948 when his father became the first dean of Talbot Theological Seminary. Feinberg earned his B.A. (1960) from the University of California at Los Angeles, his B.D. (1963) and Th.M. (1964) from Talbot Theological Seminary, his Th.D. (1968) from Dallas Theological Seminary, his M.A. (1971) from Roosevelt University and his Ph.D. from the University of Chicago.

Feinberg was married in 1967 to Iris Nadine (née Taylor), whom he met at Moody. Paul's brother John (born 1946) serves as the chair of the Department of Biblical and Systematic Theology at Trinity Evangelical Divinity School.

Career
Feinberg taught from 1966 to 1970 at Moody Bible Institute, then from 1970 to 1972 at Trinity College. From 1972 through 1974, he served as a field representative for the American Board of Missions to the Jews, and then joined the faculty of Trinity Evangelical Divinity School, where he taught the rest of his life.

Feinberg was also an ordained minister in the Evangelical Free Church of America, and in 1977 he helped found the Village Church (EFCA) of Lincolnshire, Illinois. In 1977 he served a year as president of the Evangelical Philosophical Society. He also taught at the Japan Bible Seminary, Asian Theological Seminary in Manila, Tyndale Theological Seminary, and the Italian Bible Institute in Rome.

He was also a Pitcher at UCLA during his college career.

Works

Thesis

Books

Chapters

 - and responses to other views.

He also contributed articles to Baker's Dictionary of Christian Ethics and the Wycliffe Bible Encyclopedia, as well as a chapter in Inerrancy by Norman Geisler.

Journal articles

Death
Feinberg died of congestive heart failure on February 21, 2004, in Highland Park, Illinois, after earlier falling and fracturing a hip at Trinity.

References

1938 births
2004 deaths
20th-century American theologians
20th-century evangelicals
21st-century American theologians
21st-century evangelicals
American male non-fiction writers
Biola University faculty
Dallas Theological Seminary alumni
Evangelical theologians
Evangelical writers
Jewish American writers
Members of the Evangelical Free Church of America
People from Dallas
Roosevelt University alumni
Trinity Evangelical Divinity School alumni
Trinity International University faculty
University of California, Los Angeles alumni
University of Chicago alumni